Captain Robert Norwood Hall was a World War I flying ace credited with five aerial victories.

Hall tallied his first win on 24 April 1917, when he drove an enemy two-seater down out of control. On 7 May, he became a balloon buster by destroying three observation balloons on the same mission; Lieutenant Charles Cudemore shared credit on two of these. On 15 August, he destroyed an Albatros D.V for his last triumph. Upon return to Home Establishment, he served with No. 44 Squadron until at least May 1918.

References

Bibliography
 Above the Trenches: a Complete Record of the Fighter Aces and Units of the British Empire Air Forces 1915-1920. Christopher F. Shores, Norman L. R. Franks, Russell Guest. Grub Street, 1990. , .
 Nieuport Aces of World War 1. Norman Franks. Osprey Publishing, 2000. , .

South African World War I flying aces
South African people of British descent
White South African people
Recipients of the Military Cross
1888 births
Year of death missing